Svetlana is a common Orthodox Slavic feminine given name, deriving from the East and South Slavic root svet, meaning "light", "shining", "luminescent", "pure", "blessed", or "holy", depending upon context similar if not the same as the word Shweta in Sanskrit.

Particularly unique among similar common Russian names, this one is not of ancient Slavic origin, but was coined by Alexander Vostokov in 1802 and popularized by Vasily Zhukovsky in his eponymous ballad "Svetlana", the latter first published in 1813. The name is also used in Ukraine, Belarus, Slovakia, Macedonia, and Serbia, with a number of occurrences in non-Slavic countries.

In the Russian Orthodox Church Svetlana is used as a Russian translation of Photina (derived from phos ("light")), a name sometimes ascribed to the Samaritan woman at Jacob's well (the Bible, John 4).

Semantically similar names to this are Lucia (of Latin origin, meaning "light"), Claire ("light" or "clear" in French, equivalent to Spanish and Portuguese Clara), Roxana (from Old Persian, "little shiny star, light"), and Shweta (Sanskrit, "white, pure").

Variants 

The Ukrainian equivalent of the name is Svitlana, the Belarusian is Sviatlana, the Polish variant is Świetlana, and the Czech is Světlana. The Serbo-Croatian speaking area has three pronunciations: Ijekavian Svjetlana, Ekavian Svetlana and Ikavian Svitlana are used according to local customs.

Diminutives 

Russian language diminutives include Sveta, used in Russian-speaking countries, and Lana (the latter is mainly used outside the former USSR).

Sveta also means "saint" in Bulgarian. The Slavic element Svet means "blessed, holy, bright".

Serbian language diminutives of the name are Sveta (Света), and Ceca (Цеца, pronounced Tsetsa).

Ban on name 
The Russian onomasticon in the 19th century was a closed conservative system, practically incapable of replenishment. A new name could appear only through the recognition by the Russian Orthodox Church of a new saint – the bearer of the name. But by the 19th century, the list of permitted names was generally established and the new saints did not affect the namebook (menologium), since they already bore names from the calendar; their glorification merely reproduced famous names. For example, the name Ivan was mentioned 79 times in the calendar of the late 19th century.

People 
 Svetlana Abrosimova, Russian professional basketball player
 Svetlana Alexievich, Belarusian journalist, writer, 2015 Nobel laureate in Literature
 Svetlana Alliluyeva, the youngest daughter of Joseph Stalin
 Svetlana Biryukova (born 1991), Russian long jumper
 Svetlana Boiko, Russian fencer
 Svetlana Boginskaya, Soviet Belarusian gymnast
 Svetlana Bolshakova, Belgian triple jump athlete
 Svetla Bozhkova (or Svetlana), Bulgarian discus thrower
 Svetlana Cherkasova, Russian middle distance runner
 Svetlana Chmakova, Russian-born comics artist
 Svetlana Gladysheva, Russian alpine skier
 Svetlana Gorshenina, Uzbekistani historian of Central Asia
 Svetlana Ishmouratova, Russian biathlete and soldier
 Svetlana Kapanina, Russian aerobatic pilot
 Svetlana Khodchenkova, Russian actress
 Svetlana Khorkina, Russian gymnast
 Svetlana Koroleva (model), Russian model
 Svetlana Koroleva (water polo), Kazakhstani waterpolo player
 Svetlana Koroleva-Babich, Soviet javelin thrower
 Svetlana Krachevskaya, Soviet Olympic silver medalist in shot put
 Svetlana Kuzina, Russian water polo player
 Svetlana Nikolaevna Kryuchkova, Russian actress
 Svetlana Valentinovna Kryuchkova, Russian volleyball player
 Svetlana Kulikova, Russian ice dancer
 Svetlana Kuznetsova, Russian tennis player
 Svetlana Loboda, Ukrainian singer
 Svetlana Lunkina, Russian ballet dancer
 Svetlana Masterkova, Russian middle distance runner
 Svetlana Matveeva, Russian chess player
 Svitlana Maziy, Ukrainian rower
 Svetlana Medvedeva, wife of Russian Prime Minister Dmitry Anatolyevich Medvedev
 Svetlana Melnikova, Soviet discus thrower and shotputter
 Svetlana Moskalets, Russian heptathlete
 Svetlana Nageykina, Soviet/Russian cross-country skier
 Svetlana Pankratova, world record-holder for longest female legs
 Svetlana Paramygina, Soviet Belarusian biathlete
 Svetlana Petcherskaia, Russian biathlete
 Svetlana Pletneva, Russian archeologist and historian
 Svetlana Ražnatović, Serbian pop-folk singer from Serbia
 Svetlana Roudenko, Russian-American mathematician
 Svetlana Savitskaya, Soviet cosmonaut
 Svetlana Smirnova, Soviet and Russian actress
 Svetlana Smirnova (sport shooter), Soviet and Russian sport shooter
 Svetlana Ulmasova, Soviet long-distance runner
 Svetlana Vysokova, Russian speed skater
 Svetlana Zainetdinova, Soviet-Estonian chess player and coach
 Svetlana Zakharova (dancer), principal dancer with the Bolshoï Ballet
 Svetlana Zakharova (athlete), Russian long-distance runner

See also 
 Alexander Vostokov
 Shweta, equivalent South Asian name
 Keiko, equivalent Japanese name

References 

Russian feminine given names